Acacia dictyoneura is a shrub of the genus Acacia and the subgenus Plurinerves native to the south coast of Western Australia.

Description
They are erect and have an obliquely oval or elliptic shape with two or three raised main nerves. Yellow globular flowerheads appear from August to November in the species' native range.

Taxonomy
The species was formally described in 1904 by German botanist Ernst Pritzel, based on plant material collected near Cape Riche.
It was reclassified as Racosperma dictyoneurum in 2003 by Leslie Pedley and transferred back to the genus Acacia in 2006.
It is closely related to Acacia awestoniana.

Distribution
It is found in the Great Southern region of Western Australia between Albany in the west, Gnowangerup in the north and Ravensthorpe in the east where it is often situated along riverbanks and on gentle slopes growing in loamy soils. The bulk of the population is found in the catchment area of the Pallinup and Fitzgerald Rivers.

See also
List of Acacia species

References

dictyoneura
Acacias of Western Australia
Fabales of Australia
Taxa named by Ernst Pritzel
Plants described in 1904